The 2016–17 Colgate Raiders women's basketball team represented Colgate University during the 2016–17 NCAA Division I women's basketball season. The Raiders, led by first year head coach Bill Cleary, played their home games at Cotterell Court and were members of the Patriot League. They finished the season 10–20, 7–11 in Patriot League play to finish in a tie for eighth place. They lost in the quarterfinals of the Patriot League women's tournament to Army.

Roster

Schedule

|-
!colspan=9 style="background:#800000; color:#FFFFFF;"| Non-conference regular season

|-
!colspan=9 style="background:#800000; color:#FFFFFF;"| Patriot League regular season

|-
!colspan=9 style="background:#800000; color:#FFFFFF;"| Patriot League Women's Tournament

See also
 2016–17 Colgate Raiders men's basketball team

References

Colgate
Colgate Raiders women's basketball seasons